Evaristo Merino Canales de la Cerda (died 27 August 1930) was the ninth Mayor of the commune of Pichilemu, office which he held between May 1927 and May 1928, although the latter date is disputed.

Biography

Personal life and early work
Evaristo Merino Canales, son of Evaristo Merino and Rita Canales married Rosa Silva Valenzuela on 8 June 1896, with whom he had ten children: Antonieta, Raquel, Eduardo, Jorge, Adolfo, Rosa, Evaristo, Marcial, Modesto, and Sergio. In March 1900, he began working as administrator of Agustín Ross Edwards' resort in Pichilemu, and did so until the death of Ross in October 1926.

Mayor of Pichilemu and death
He was appointed mayor of the junta de vecinos (neighbors' council) of Pichilemu by decree of the president on 15 May 1927. Local historian and journalist José Arraño Acevedo stated that Merino's mayorship lasted until his resignation in February 1928, as he wanted to "move definitely to his native Curicó", while Antonio Saldías asserts Merino's mayorship lasted until 14 May 1928.

On 27 August 1930, just two years and a half since he left Pichilemu, he died in Curicó, and his ashes were buried at the local cemetery, in a mausoleum which he shares with his wife, who died in August 1925.

References

1930 deaths
People from Curicó
Mayors of Pichilemu
1868 births